Rivermount College is a non-denominational, co-educational Christian College situated in Yatala, Queensland, Australia. The school serves students from Prep through to Year 12.

References

External links 
 Rivermount College homepage

Private schools in Queensland
Schools in South East Queensland
Educational institutions established in 1992
Nondenominational Christian schools in Queensland
Junior School Heads Association of Australia Member Schools
1992 establishments in Australia